Protein arginine methyltransferase 8 is a protein that in humans is encoded by the PRMT8 gene. Arginine methylation is a posttranslational modification involved in a number of cellular processes, including DNA repair, RNA transcription, signal transduction and protein compartmentalization. PRMT8 binds and dimethylates Ewing sarcoma breakpoint region 1 (EWS) protein.

Model organisms
			
Model organisms have been used in the study of PRMT8 function. A conditional knockout mouse line, called Prmt8tm1a(EUCOMM)Wtsi was generated as part of the International Knockout Mouse Consortium program — a high-throughput mutagenesis project to generate and distribute animal models of disease to interested scientists.

Male and female animals underwent a standardized phenotypic screen to determine the effects of deletion. Twenty four tests were carried out on homozygous mutant mice and one significant abnormality was observed: the animals had decreased IgG1 levels.

References

Further reading 
 

Human proteins
Genes mutated in mice